For My Father (translit. Sof Shavua B'Tel Aviv) is a 2008 Israeli drama film directed by Dror Zahavi. It was entered into the 30th Moscow International Film Festival.

Cast
 Shredi Jabarin as Tarek (as Shredy Jabarin)
  as Keren
  as Katz
 Jony Arbid as Abed (as Joni Arvid)
 Shadi Fahr-Al-Din as Salim
 Rozina Cambos as Zipora
 Dina Golan as Sara
 Chaim Banai as Rehavia (as Haim Banai)
 Oren Yadger as Shaul
 Michael Moshonov as Shlomi

References

External links
 

2008 films
2008 drama films
Israeli drama films
2000s Hebrew-language films